The 2013–14 Khuzestan Premier League season was the 14th season of the Khuzestan Premier League which took place from September 30, 2013 to May 3, 2014 with 14 teams competing from the province of Khuzestan. Teams played home and away with one another each playing 26 matches. Naftun Masjedsoleiman finished the season on top of the standings and was promoted to division 3 of the Iranian football system. Meanwhile, finishing in last place, Sheiban Bavi will be relegated to the Khuzestan Division 1 league.

Teams 

Source:

Final Standings

See also 

 2013–14 Azadegan League
 2013–14 League 2
 2013–14 League 3
 2013–14 Hazfi Cup
 2014 Iranian Super Cup

References 

Khuzestan Premier League
1
Iran